Pseudoswammerdamia combinella is a moth of the family Yponomeutidae. It is found in Europe and Anatolia.

The wingspan is 13–16 mm. The head is white, sometimes fuscous-mixed. Forewings are light greyish -ochreous more or less irrorated with white; base of dorsum fuscous; several longitudinal series of dark fuscous marks; a roundish golden-ochreous apical spot, partly edged anteriorly with dark fuscous; apical cilia fuscous, with two black lines. The larva is dull green; dorsal line darker; subdorsal series of dull red dots; head yellowish.

The moth flies from April to May..

The larvae feed on Prunus spinosa.

Notes
The flight season refers to Belgium and the Netherlands. This may vary in other parts of the range.

References

External links
 Pseudoswammerdamia combinella at UKmoths

Yponomeutidae
Moths described in 1786
Moths of Europe
Moths of Asia